Najwa is a studio album by American jazz trumpeter Wadada Leo Smith. The album was released on October 20, 2017 via Finnish TUM Records label.

Background
Najwa continues a series of Smith's dedicatory albums of varying size and breadth, embracing human and natural subjects. Four of the five tracks pay homage to composers or performers long or recently departed: Ornette Coleman, John Coltrane, Ronald Shannon Jackson, and Billie Holiday. The fifth and title track simply and enigmatically references "a love lost."

Reception
A reviewer at Dusty Groove wrote, "Wadada Leo Smith is really on fire here – on a record that feels a lot more like something from the early 80s underground than some of his earlier work – from the lineup of performers, right down to the overall sound of the set! The group's very heavy on guitars – and features work from Michael Gregory Jackson, Henry Kaiser, Brandon Ross, and Lamar Smith on the instrument – often criss-crossing and weaving these beautiful sonic textures – powerful, but never too noisy, and augmented beautifully by some surprisingly thoughtful bass work by Bill Laswell – whose at his most subtle and collaborative here."

S. Victor Aaron of Something Else! wrote, "Wadada Leo Smith has never been one to conceal his influences but when he celebrates the geniuses who motivated him, it’s his own genius that becomes the most illuminating thing in his music. Najwa is one of those particularly bright moments in a catalog full of them."

Track listing

Personnel

Band
Wadada Leo Smith – composer, liner notes, trumpet
Pheeroan akLaff – drums
Michael Gregory – guitar
Henry Kaiser – guitar
Bill Laswell – bass (electric), mixing
Brandon Ross – guitar
Adam Rudolph – percussion
Lamar Smith – guitar

Production
James Dellatacoma – engineer, mixing
Michael Fossenkemper – mastering
Dan Fyte – assistant engineer
Jori Grönroos – artwork, photography
Petri Haussila – photography, producer
Juha Lökström – design
Robert Musso – engineer
Max Salmi – artwork
R.I. Sutherland-Cohen – photography

References

Wadada Leo Smith albums
2017 albums